The Canadian Cancer Society is Canada's largest national cancer charity and the largest national charitable funder of cancer research in Canada.

History
The idea to form the Canadian Cancer Society originally came from the Saskatchewan Medical Association in 1929, when they formed Canada's first cancer committee.

In 1937, the National Study Committee recommended the formation of new organization, which was later called Canadian Cancer Society for the Control of Cancer.

The Canadian Cancer Society (CCS) was officially formed a decade later, in 1938, to educate Canadians about the early warning signs of cancer. At that time, many people did not seek medical help until their cancer had advanced past a treatable stage.

In 1947, CCS began funding cancer research through the creation of the National Cancer Institute of Canada (NCIC) an agreement between the Canadian Cancer Society and the Federal Department of Health and Welfare. The Society continues to fund cancer research today.

In February 2017, the Canadian Cancer Society announced that it would merge with the Canadian Breast Cancer Foundation in an effort to reduce redundancies and operating costs. The merged operation will continue to operate as the Canadian Cancer Society.

In 2020, CCS amalgamated with Prostate Cancer Canada.

Organization
The Canadian Cancer Society consists of:
 18 offices across Canada
 approximately 50,000 volunteers (including canvassers)
 approximately 600-650 full-time staff

Public accountability for the organization rests at the national level. The national Board of Directors has 21 volunteer representatives from across Canada. The CEO of the Canadian Cancer Society is Andrea Seale.

Fundraising

The Daffodil Campaign 
The logo for the Canadian Cancer Society is the daffodil. The flower had served as a symbol of cancer awareness since the 1950s, when volunteers for CCS organized a fundraising tea in Toronto; the volunteers used daffodils to decorate the tables, as they thought it would create hope that cancer could be beaten.

The use of daffodils for fundraising began in 1956, when volunteers handed out daffodils at Toronto-area restaurants, as a means to spread the message about cancer awareness; at first, the daffodils were given to the patrons, just to get the word out about cancer, but when some wanted to pay for the flowers or make a donation, it was realized that the daffodils could be used as a fundraising tool for CCS.

This led to the first Daffodil Days in the spring of 1957, when CCS volunteers in Toronto raised over $1,200 on sales of daffodils.  As the first flower of spring, the daffodil became a symbol of hope in the fight against cancer and Daffodil Days fundraising events spread throughout the rest of Canada and amongst cancer organizations around the world, including the American Cancer Society, the Irish Cancer Society and The Cancer Council Australia.

Since then, Daffodil Days has evolved to the annual Daffodil Campaign, one of CCS’s signature fundraising events. Each year, CCS raises funds to help those affected by cancer through daffodil pin and live flower sales, canvassing and galas. 

In 2000, the CCS adopted the daffodil as part of its logo, replacing the sword and snakes logo, which symbolized the rod of Asclepius, the dominant symbol for professional healthcare associations in North America. Many cancer organizations have also incorporated the daffodil in their logos including The Cancer Council Australia, Irish Cancer Society and Marie Curie Cancer Care, although the American Cancer Society continues to use a rod of Asclepius-styled logo.

Relay For Life 
Relay For Life is one of Canadian Cancer Society's signature fundraising event. Relay For Life is a non-competitive, outdoor, overnight relay held in hundreds of communities across Canada every year. The 12-hour relay brings teams of 10 people together to take turns walking, running or wheeling around a track from 7 p.m. to 7 a.m. Main events include a Survivors' Victory Lap, a luminary ceremony to remember loved ones lost to cancer as well as anything from karaoke to bingo to help keep people energized throughout the night. In 2009, the event raised more than $52 million for CCS at 474 events across Canada.

Thing-a-ma-boob 
Introduced in 2005, the Thing-a-ma-boob is an educational keyring made of four different sized beads, each indicating the various sized lumps that can be detected through regular breast self-exams, physical exams by a healthcare professional, first mammogram, to regular mammograms.

Money raised from the sale of the Thing-a-ma-boob will go towards funding breast cancer research, providing support services for victims and their families, as well as prevention and advocacy initiatives.

Activities

The Canadian Cancer Society offers a variety of information and support services to Canadians including:
 A bilingual, toll-free Cancer Information Service (1 888 939-3333)
 CancerConnection.ca – a peer-support program that connects people with similar cancer experiences
 Child, youth and family supports – year-round recreation programs and summer camps for children and young adults with cancer and their families
 Accommodation and transportation services in some areas
 Free wigs for cancer patients and trained professionals to help with fitting
 Smokers' Helpline is a national tobacco cessation service
 Community Services Locator – a searchable database of over 4,000 cancer-related services and resources nationwide. 

Big Tobacco Lies is a campaign run by the Tobacco Industry Action Committee to provide outreach and information on tobacco use. The group lobbied for Bill 45, the Making Healthier Choices act, which was passed in May 2015.

Research 
The Canadian Cancer Society is the largest national charitable funder of cancer research. Cancer research is funded through the Canadian Cancer Society Research Institute. Using a peer review process, research grants and training opportunities are funded for all types of cancer and include basic laboratory research, clinical trials as well as behavioral, psychosocial and population-based cancer research.

The survival rate for Canadians with cancer to survive at least five years jumped from 25% in the 1940s to over 60% as of 2020. In 2020-2021, the Canadian Cancer Society invested $46.8M in life-changing research with 200 lead researchers supported. 

The Canadian Cancer Society created the Research Information Outreach Teams (RIOT) in Kingston, London, Toronto, and Ottawa with university students and young scientists focused on community outreach.

Notable research that the Canadian Cancer Society has funded includes:
 the development of the cobalt-60 unit in the 1950s to treat cancer tumors with cobalt therapy, a treatment still widely used today
 the discovery of vinblastine as successful chemotherapy for Hodgkin lymphoma in the 1950s, also a treatment for cancer still used today

The Canadian Cancer Society also advocates on behalf of Canadians by encouraging governments to pass public policies that will help prevent cancer and help people who have cancer. Issues the Society advocates for include tobacco control, ornamental use of pesticides, health systems reform, occupational carcinogen exposure, cancer screening and gene patenting.

The Canadian Cancer Society gives out four research awards in the advancement in the field of cancer research. The Robert L. Noble Prize is given for achievements in basic biomedical cancer research. The O. Harold Warwick Prize is given to researchers who made accomplishments in cancer control research.

See also

References

External links
 Canadian Cancer Society
 "Daffodil Days"
 "Relay For Life"
 "Cops for Cancer"
 "Ride2Survive"
  "Canadian Cancer Trials"

Charities based in Canada
Cancer organizations based in Canada
Organizations based in Canada with royal patronage
Organizations established in 1938
Organizations based in Toronto
1938 establishments in Canada